Eugenio Novo Neira known as Uxío Novoneyra (Parada de Moreda, Courel, 19 January 1930 – Santiago de Compostela, 30 October 1999) was a Galician poet, journalist and writer of children's literature from Galicia, Spain. 

He was born into a farming family. He started writing poems when he was at high school in Lugo. He went on to study Philosophy and Literature in Madrid. In 1951, he began publishing in Galician language. In 1962, he began working in TV and radio in Madrid. In 1973, he married Elva Rey and they had three children. In 1983 he moved to Santiago de Compostela where he worked for the Association of Writers in the Galician Language until he died in 1999. In his works, he expresses his nationalist and Marxist views through intricate poetic patterns.

Books 
Os eidos (1955), Vigo, Edicións Xerais de Galicia, 84-7507-455-3
Os eidos 2. Letanía de Galicia e outros poemas (1974), Vigo Ed. Galaxia 84-7154-221-8
Poemas caligráficos (1979) Madrid, Brais Pinto,  
Libro do Courel (1981)
Muller pra lonxe (1987) Lugo, 84-505-4535-8
Do Courel a Compostela 1956-1986 (1988) Santiago de Compostela, Sotelo Blanco 84-86021-80-4
O cubil de Xabarín (1990) Madrid, Edlevives : 84-263-1956-4
Tempo de elexía (1991) Oleiros,  Vía Láctea 84-86531-58-6
Gorgorín e Cabezón (1992) Madrid,Edelvives, 84-263-2170-4
Poemas de doada certeza i este brillo premido entre as pálpebras (1994) A Coruña, Espiral Maior 84-88137-39-7
Betanzos: Poema dos Caneiros e Estampas (1998)
Dos soños teimosos Noitarenga (1998) Santiago de compostela, Noitarenga, 84-921096-5-3
Ilda, o lobo, o corzo e o xabarín (1998) Zaragoza, Edelvives, 84-263-3727-9
Arrodeos e desvíos do Camiño de Santiago e outras rotas (1999)A Coruña, Hércules Ediciones, 84-453-2306-7

20th-century Spanish writers
Writers from Galicia (Spain)
1930 births
1999 deaths